Chaudenay may refer to the following places in France:

Chaudenay, Haute-Marne, a commune in the Haute-Marne department 
Chaudenay, Saône-et-Loire, a commune in the Saône-et-Loire department 
Chaudenay-la-Ville, a commune in the Côte-d'Or department
Chaudenay-le-Château, a commune in the Côte-d'Or department

Other uses
An alternative name for the wine grape Chardonnay